AIR International is a British aviation magazine covering current defence aerospace and civil aviation topics. It has been in publication since 1971 and is currently published by Key Publishing Ltd.

History and profile
The magazine was first published in June 1971 with the name Air Enthusiast. In January 1974 its title was changed to  Air Enthusiast International and finally to Air International in July 1974.

Air International is published by Key Publishing Limited. The magazine has its headquarters in Stamford, Lincolnshire. Sister publications include Air Forces Monthly, Airliner World, Airports International and FlyPast.

References

External links 
List of Air International issues with article index

1971 establishments in the United Kingdom
Aviation magazines
Monthly magazines published in the United Kingdom
Transport magazines published in the United Kingdom
Magazines established in 1971
Mass media in Lincolnshire
Military magazines published in the United Kingdom